The Gaon Album Chart is a South Korean record chart that ranks the best-selling albums and EPs in South Korea. It is part of the Gaon Music Chart, which launched in February 2010. The data are compiled by the Ministry of Culture, Sports and Tourism and the Korea Music Content Industry Association based upon weekly/monthly physical album sales by six major South Korean distributors: LOEN Entertainment, S.M. Entertainment, Sony Music Korea, Warner Music Korea, Universal Music and Mnet Media.

Weekly charts

Monthly charts

References

External links 
  Current Gaon Album Chart

2017
Korea, South albums
2017 in South Korean music